The Sonoma Index-Tribune is a community newspaper published twice a week in Sonoma, California. The newspaper was published by four generations of the same family for 128 years, but is now owned by a group of local media investors.

History

The Sonoma Index was founded in 1879 by Benjamin Frank. The newspaper changed ownership about a dozen times in its first five years.

It was purchased in 1884 by Harry Granice, who gave the paper its current name and brought stability. Granice published and edited the newspaper until his death in 1915.

His eldest daughter, Celeste Granice Murphy, then took control of the paper, purchasing it with her husband Walter Murphy from her father's estate. Celeste Granice was already an experienced newspaper editor, who had built the San Rafael Daily Independent from a weekly to a daily paper. After a merger, that paper became the Marin Independent Journal in 1948, which is still published. The couple ran the Sonoma newspaper with Celeste serving as editor and Walter as business manager until 1949, when they sold it to Celeste's nephew Robert M. Lynch, and retired. Celeste Granice Murphy is now a member of the Hall of Fame of the California Press Foundation.

Robert Lynch was born in San Francisco in 1920 and had served in the U.S. Navy during World War II. He built the newspaper to 65 employees and expanded the circulation from 2000 to 12,000. He served as president of both the California Newspaper Publishers Association and the California Press Association, and died in 2003.

Lynch's sons Bill Lynch and Jim Lynch operated as co-publishers until they retired in 2012 and sold the newspaper to outside investors. Four generations of the family had operated the Sonoma Index-Tribune for 128 years.

Current ownership and management

The newspaper is now owned by Sonoma Media Investments, LLC. Emily Charrier is the editor and publisher.

References

External links 

Newspapers published in California
Sonoma, California